Hugh Nelson (May 25, 1830 – March 3, 1893) was a Canadian parliamentarian and the fourth Lieutenant Governor of British Columbia.

Born in his father's residence, Shore Cottage in Magheramorne, Larne, County Antrim, Ireland, the son of Robert Nelson, Esq. and Frances Quinn, he emigrated to California in 1854. He arrived in British Columbia in 1858, but unlike the horde of others who arrived in that year he had not come in pursuit of gold but to participate in the building of the colony as an English dominion.  Eschewing the goldfields themselves, he founded the B.C. & Victoria Express Company, which had the dominant share of the freight and travel market between Victoria and New Westminster and Yale, with partner George Dietz, and also the lumbering firm Moody, Dietz and Nelson, the third partner of which was Sewell Moody, which was the operating name of Moodyville Sawmill Co. in what is now North Vancouver.  The freighting firm was sold off early on to Frank Barnard Sr., whose B.C. Express Company then became the leading firm for shipments and travel to and from the Cariboo region

Although active in politics, he did not stand for office to the Legislative Council until 1870 (for the colonial riding of New Westminster), by which time he had become one of the principal promoters of British Columbia's merger with the Confederation of Canada.  He was a member of the Yale Convention, which ushered in BC's union with Canada, and was on the committee of that body charged with seeing the agreement come into effect.  He was a member of the colonial Legislative Assembly of British Columbia, and in 1871 was one of the first Members of Parliament from British Columbia to the House of Commons, representing
New Westminster District.

A Liberal-Conservative, he was re-elected in 1872. He did not run in 1874. In 1879, he was appointed to the Senate of Canada representing the senatorial division of Barkerville, British Columbia. He withdrew from business in 1882, and in February 1887, married Emily Stanton, daughter of J.B. Stanton, Esq., of the Canadian civil service.  He and resigned his senate seat in 1887, when he was appointed Lieutenant-Governor of British Columbia. In 1892, he resigned as Lieutenant-Governor and returned to England where he died the following March of Bright's disease.

Family

Hon Hugh Nelson, then a Senator married September 17, 1885 Emily Stanton, daughter of Isaac Brock Stanton and his wife, Maria Wilson. Emily was born and educated in Canada. The couple lived at 354 Cooper Street, Ottawa and Government House, Victoria during Hugh Nelson`s terms of office. He died in London, England on March 3, 1893.

References

External links
 
 
 

1830 births
1893 deaths
Canadian senators from British Columbia
Conservative Party of Canada (1867–1942) MPs
Conservative Party of Canada (1867–1942) senators
Lieutenant Governors of British Columbia
Members of the House of Commons of Canada from British Columbia
People from Larne
Politicians from County Antrim
Canadian people of Ulster-Scottish descent
Irish emigrants to pre-Confederation British Columbia